Stumpy Point Bay is a bay in Dare County, North Carolina.

Tree stumps in and around Stumpy Point Bay account for its name.

References

Bodies of water of Dare County, North Carolina
Bays of North Carolina